Go-Ahead London is the trading name used collectively for the London bus operations of the Go-Ahead Group. The name first appeared in August 2008, before which the company had traded under separate names and brands. It is currently (as of February 2023) the largest bus operator in Greater London, operating a total of 153 bus routes mainly in South and Central London as well as some services into North and East London with a fleet size of over 2,400 vehicles under contract to Transport for London.

History

The Go-Ahead Group is a large transport group based in Newcastle. It first became involved in London bus operations in September 1994, whereupon the privatisation of London Buses, it purchased London Central for £23.8 million. In May 1996, it added another former London Buses subsidiary, London General, which had been sold in 1994 to a management buyout for £46 million. These two companies subsequently developed in much the same way, both establishing a livery of red with a charcoal skirt and yellow relief band, and splitting orders for new buses.

Further expansion did not occur until September 2006, when Docklands Buses was purchased. On 29 June 2007, the Go-Ahead purchased Blue Triangle. With these purchases, Go-Ahead surpassed Arriva London to become the largest operator of buses in London, running around 16% of London bus services.

A corporate image for Go-Ahead's London bus services started to appear in August 2008, when a new Go-Ahead London logo was unveiled.

In 2009, Transport for London invited bids for the sale of their own bus operations which ran under the East Thames Buses brand. Go-Ahead London were selected as the preferred bidder and assumed full responsibility for 10 routes and two depots in October that year. The East Thames brand was replaced with the Go-Ahead London brand. The East Thames operations were initially absorbed under the London General arm of Go-Ahead's London business. However, after some route movements and allocation changes some of the services now run under the London Central.

On 30 March 2012, Go-Ahead purchased Northumberland Park Garage from First London with all routes brought under the London General wing.

On 1 April 2014, Go-Ahead restructured its Metrobus business, with the management of the Transport for London contracted services passing to the control of Go-Ahead London, with the remaining services administered by Brighton & Hove from 1 July 2014. Services are now operated under an expanded London General licence, however the Metrobus trading name is retained. London General's licence was formally increased by the Vehicle and Operator Services Agency on 25 April 2014.

Current subsidiaries
The current subsidiaries of Go-Ahead London are, in order of acquisition:
London Central (September 1994)
London General (May 1996)
Docklands Buses (September 2006)
Blue Triangle (June 2007)
Metrobus (April 2014)

References

External links 

 

Go-Ahead Group London bus operators
London bus operators